Goalball  in Cameroon is one of several sports available to people with vision impairments to participate in.  It arrived late to the blind sports community in Cameroon, with torball arriving first.  It has subsequently, been supported domestically by clubs such as Club for the Blind Youth of Cameroon (CJARC) and PROMHANDICAM Yaounde.

The sport has had been included on the domestic sports calendar, with national competitions taking place in 2006, 2012, and 2014.  Cameroon has also been involved with the sport on the international level, with the men playing in the 2007 All-Africa Games and the 2008 African Francophone Games for the Handicapped.  The women's team has been invited to participate in several competitions.  The country has both men and women players who were classified internationally for the 2016 summer season.  Some of these players have also represented Cameroon internationally in athletics.

Club and association support 
Goalball was a late arrival to the blind sports community in Cameroon.  The sport was introduced in the 2000s.  Prior to that, the major ball sport for blind people in Cameroon was torball.  Since then, the sport is supported by local clubs and schools, and via activities at conferences and other events.

Club for the Blind Youth of Cameroon (CJARC) is an association supporting blind youth.  In 2006, they supported a number of sporting activities for the blind at their club including athletics, African wrestling, judo and goalball.  The club was still active supporting women's goalball in 2014, 2015 and 2016. Another association supporting disability sports is PROMHANDICAM Yaounde.  In 2004, they were supporting wheelchair basketball and goalball.  That year, the club was visited by England's Prince Edward.

The sport has also appeared on the program for conferences related to disability rights in Cameroon.  An example of this occurred at the 2012  Vaincre Handicap Conference, which took place in November in Douala, when Public School Akwa played an exhibition match against Douala.

Domestic competitions 
Goalball has been supported by a number of domestic competitions in the country. The sport was contested at the 2006 Champion of Cameroon in Handicap Sports that took place at the Higher Institute of Youth and Sports.  PROMHANDICAM won the event, defeating CJARC 17 - 9 in the final.

Camtel Yaoundé has organized several national championships for goalball.  Following the 2011-2012 domestic season, they organized a men's and women's national club championship.  The men's final saw Rouffignac go up against CJARC.  The match was close with CJARC coming out ahead by a score of 4 - 3.  In the women's final, Fadi beat BGSA 13 - 3. The domestic season again took place for 2013–2014.  Following the conclusion of the season, Camtel Yaoundé hosted the men's national club championship, with four teams taking part.  These teams were Evangelical College Goalball Club of Douala, Cispam Goalball Cub of Bafoussam, Mount Cameroon Buea Goalball and PROMHANDICAM Yaounde.

International competitions 
Cameroon has participated in international goalball competitions, with the country having had both men and women's national teams competing abroad.

Cameroon sent a team to the 2007 All-Africa Games.  The roster included André Patrick Ndo Andeme, Hervé Paulain Nomy Ngoma, Luc  Yombi Kifie,  and Boulom Théophile R. Le Grand. Goalball was on the program for the 2008 African Francophone Games for the Handicapped, which Cameroon was originally scheduled to host in July, but the Ministry of Sports and Physical Education postponed them because of poor facilities and lack of access to quality equipment.   The Games did not take place until August. The men's national goalball team won gold at the event after Cameroon beat the Central African Republic 11 - 1 in the first game, and 13 - 3 in the return match.

The women's national team was invited to participate in the 2015 IBSA World Games in South Korea. In 2016, Cameroon was supposed to send a women's team to participate in International Blind Sports Federation (IBSA) Goalball Africa Regional Championships.  Along with Cameroon, other nations that were supposed to participate in the women's tournament included Algeria, Côte d'Ivoire, Egypt, Ghana, Kenya, Morocco and Tunisia.  The tournament was the first African Regional Championships which featured a women's competition.  Their participation was in question until very close to the start of the tournament because of issues related to visas and international licenses.  Cameroon ended up not going, with only Algeria, Egypt, Tunisia and Morocco participating.

Goalball players 
Cameroon has 13 players who had been classified internationally by the IBSA for the 2016 summer international goalball season. A number of these players have also represented Cameroon in athletics, including André Patrick Ndo Andeme and Simone Edwige Amandi Ngono.   The women's national team assistant coach was Pascal Ele Mvondo.

Translations

References 

Cameroon